The Jersey Justice were an Independent Women's Tackle Football Team based in Carteret, New Jersey. The team was formed in 2008 with many former players and staff from the New Jersey Titans. Home games in 2011 are to be played on the campus of St. John Vianney High School in Holmdel Township, New Jersey. Prior to 2011 they played all home games at Carteret High School. The Justice elected to not finish the 2011 season after playing only 3 games and are defunct.

History
The Justice were established in late 2008 and originally planning to be a member of the National Women's Football Association.  Once the NWFA folded, however, the Justice began play in the spring 2009 season as a member of the Independent Women's Football League.  In the team's inaugural season, they earned a spot in the league's Divisional Playoff Game, defeating the New England Intensity by a score of 30-7 and advanced to the league's Regional Championship Game (Tier II Semifinal), losing to the Montreal Blitz by a score of 9–8.

2010 proved to be an even better season record-wise, as the Justice finished 6–1.  However, because of the IWFL's playoff method, the Justice were left out of the postseason (only two teams per division got to go, and the Justice finished third behind the Montreal Blitz and New England Intensity-coincidentally the same two teams they faced in the previous year's postseason).

For the 2011 season, the Justice played as an Independent team.

Season-By-Season

|-
| colspan="6" align="center" | Jersey Justice (IWFL)
|-
|2009 || 5 || 3 || 0 || 7th Tier II || Won Tier II Quarterfinal (New England)Lost Tier II Semifinal (Montreal)
|-
|2010 || 6 || 1 || 0 || 3rd Tier II East Northeast || 
|-
| colspan="6" align="center" | Jersey Justice (INDEPENDENT)
|-
|2011 || 1 || 6 || 0 || -- || --
|-
!Totals || 13 || 11 || 0
|colspan="2"| (including playoffs)

Season schedules

2009

2010

2011

Holmdel Township, New Jersey
Women's Spring Football League teams
American football teams in New Jersey
American football teams established in 2008
2008 establishments in New Jersey
American football teams in the New York metropolitan area
Women's sports in New Jersey